Erik Setiawan (born in Bandung, West Java, 23 November 1983) is an Indonesian former footballer who plays as a wing back and his height is . He is former player for the Indonesia U-23 Team, and has been coached by Sergei Dubrovin, Bernard Schumm, Juan Paez and Peter Withe.

National team career 
 2001: Indonesia U-19 Team
 2002: Indonesia U-21 Team
 2003: Indonesia U-23 Team (Sea Games)
 2005: Indonesia U-23 Team (Sea Games)

Honours

Club honors
Persebaya Surabaya
First Division (1): 2003

Country honors
Indonesia U-21
Hassanal Bolkiah Trophy : 2002

References

External links

1983 births
Living people
Indonesian footballers
Sportspeople from Bandung
Persib Bandung players
Pelita Jaya FC players
Persebaya Surabaya players
Arema F.C. players
Persija Jakarta players
Persiba Balikpapan players
Pelita Bandung Raya players
Persisam Putra Samarinda players
Liga 1 (Indonesia) players
Sundanese people
Association football defenders
Indonesia international footballers
Indonesia under-21 international footballers